Natasha Daultana is a Pakistani politician who had been a member of the National Assembly of Pakistan from February 2012 to 2013.

Political career
She was elected to the National Assembly of Pakistan from Constituency NA-168 (Vehari-II) as a candidate of Pakistan Peoples Party (PPP) in by-polls held in 2012. She received 70,551 votes and defeated Bilal Akbar Bhatti.

She ran for the seat of the National Assembly from Constituency NA-168 (Vehari-II) as a candidate of PPP in 2013 Pakistani general election, but was unsuccessful. She received 42,292 votes and lost the seat to Syed Sajid Mehdi.

References

Living people
Pakistani MNAs 2008–2013
Year of birth missing (living people)